Adrián Matušík (born 13 June 1980) is a Slovakian Paralympic athlete who competes in discus throw and shot put events at international elite events. He is a World champion and European champion in shot put and has won three medals in discus throw.

Matušík had his left leg severely injured in 2001 after an accident while digging a well which resulted in his leg amputated below the knee.

References

1980 births
Living people
Sportspeople from Bratislava
Paralympic athletes of Slovakia
Slovak male discus throwers
Slovak male shot putters
Athletes (track and field) at the 2012 Summer Paralympics
Athletes (track and field) at the 2016 Summer Paralympics
World Para Athletics Championships winners
Medalists at the World Para Athletics Championships
Medalists at the World Para Athletics European Championships
Shot putters with limb difference
Discus throwers with limb difference
Paralympic discus throwers
Paralympic shot putters